McLeansboro Township is one of twelve townships in Hamilton County, Illinois, USA.  As of the 2010 census, its population was 3,830 and it contained 1,907 housing units.

Geography

Cities, towns, villages
 McLeansboro

Unincorporated towns
 Diamond City at 
 Hoodville at 
(This list is based on USGS data and may include former settlements.)

Cemeteries
The township contains these seven cemeteries: Concord, Crisel, Glenview Memorial Gardens, Hutson, Independent Order of Oddfellows, Presley and Union Hill.

Airports and landing strips
 McLeansboro Airport

Demographics

School districts
 Hamilton County Community Unit School District 10

Political districts
 Illinois's 19th congressional district
 State House District 117
 State House District 118
 State Senate District 59

References
 
 United States Census Bureau 2009 TIGER/Line Shapefiles
 United States National Atlas

External links
 City-Data.com
 Illinois State Archives
 Township Officials of Illinois
 Hamilton County Historical Society

Townships in Hamilton County, Illinois
Mount Vernon, Illinois micropolitan area
Townships in Illinois
1885 establishments in Illinois